Ecuato Guineana de Aviación (EGA) was Equatorial Guinea's national airline, although it now appears to be defunct. Established in 1986, the carrier operated passenger and cargo services in West Africa from its main base in Malabo International Airport.

Like all other airlines having an air operator's certificate issued in Equatorial Guinea, Ecuato Guineana was banned from operating within the European Union in 2006, although it was removed from the list in 2007 because it no longer had an air operator's certificate.

Destinations 

Ecuato Guineana served the following destinations:
Bata
Douala
Libreville
Malabo

Fleet 

During the course of its history the carrier operated the following aircraft:

Antonov An-24B
Antonov An-24RV
Antonov An-26
Douglas DC-9-30
Embraer ERJ-145
Fokker F27-100
Fokker F27-200
Fokker F-28-1000
Fokker F28 Mk4000
HS-748 Series 2B
Let L-410A
Tupolev Tu-134A
Yakovlev Yak-40

Accidents and incidents 

See also 
List of defunct airlines of Equatorial Guinea

References

Bibliography

Defunct airlines of Equatorial Guinea
Airlines established in 1986
1986 establishments in Equatorial Guinea